The 1996 Belgian Procar Championship Division 1 was won by Jean Francois Hemruolle driving an Audi A4 Quattro for the Belgian Audi Vw Club. The manufacture trophy was won by Audi. The Division 2 was won by Christophe Dechavanne driving an Audi 80 Quattro for the Belgian Audi Vw Club.

Teams and drivers

 not eligible to score championship points *

Race calendar and results

Championship standings
Scoring system

Championship results

Points in the Brackets not awarded due to exclusions

Manufacturers' Trophy

Sources
 Touring Car World 96/97 — The official book of Touring car

External links

Belgian Procar Championship
Motorsport in Belgium
1996 in motorsport
1996 in Belgian motorsport